Austre Høgvagltinden is a mountain in Lom Municipality in Innlandet county, Norway. The mountains are surrounded by several other notable mountains including Kyrkja, Kyrkjeoksli, and Langvasshøi to the northeast; Skarddalstinden and Skarddalseggi to the southeast; Rauddalstindane to the southwest; and Stehøi and Stetinden to the northwest.

See also
List of mountains of Norway by height

References

Jotunheimen
Lom, Norway
Mountains of Innlandet